Cameron Leigh Stewart FRSC is a Canadian mathematician. He is a professor of pure mathematics at the University of Waterloo.

Contributions
He has made numerous contributions to number theory, in particular to work on the abc conjecture. In 1976 he obtained, with Alan Baker, an effective improvement to Liouville's Theorem. This improves on an earlier result of Enrico Bombieri and Wolfgang M. Schmidt and is close to the best possible result. In 1995 he obtained, along with Jaap Top, the existence of infinitely many quadratic, cubic, and sextic twists of elliptic curves of large rank. In 1991 and 2001 respectively, he obtained, along with Kunrui Yu, the best unconditional estimates for the abc conjecture. In 2013, he solved an old problem of Erdős (so his Erdős number is 1) involving Lucas and Lehmer numbers. In particular, he proved that the largest prime divisor  of  satisfies .

Education
Stewart completed a B.Sc. at the University of British Columbia in 1971 and a M.Sc in 1972 from McGill University. He earned his doctorate from the University of Cambridge in 1976, under the supervision of Alan Baker.

Recognition
In 1974, while at Cambridge, he was awarded the J.T. Knight Prize.

He was elected Fellow of the Royal Society of Canada in 1989. He was appointed Fellow of the Fields Institute in 2008. Since 2003 he has held a Canada Research Chair (tier 1). Since 2005 he has been appointed University Professor at the University of Waterloo. He was selected to give the annual Isidore and Hilda Dressler Lecture at Kansas State University in 2015.

He was elected as a fellow of the Canadian Mathematical Society in 2019.

Selected works

References

External links
Website at University of Waterloo

Year of birth missing (living people)
Living people
Fellows of the Canadian Mathematical Society
Fellows of the Royal Society of Canada
20th-century  Canadian mathematicians
21st-century  Canadian mathematicians
McGill University alumni
Alumni of the University of Cambridge
Academic staff of the University of Waterloo
University of British Columbia alumni
Canada Research Chairs